Fantasia is the second studio album by American recording artist Fantasia, released by J Records on December 12, 2006. In its first week of sales, Fantasia entered the US Billboard 200 chart at number nineteen, with 133,000 copies sold. In June 2007, Fantasia was certified Gold by the RIAA for shipments of 500,000 copies.

Background and recording
Missy Elliott returned as one of the writers on the album, joining Big Boi of Outkast and Diane Warren as contributors. Production duo Midi Mafia, best known for their 50 Cent hit "21 Questions", also contributed five tracks to the project.

The beat for "Baby Makin' Hips" was created by Don Cheegro and Dirty Harry, new producers working under the guidance of Dre & Vidal, producers of Ludacris' song "War with God". Her second single "When I See U" peaked at number thirty-two on the Billboard Hot 100 and at number-one for eight weeks on the Urban charts. The music video for When I See U was shot by Lenny Bass on March 26, in Brooklyn.

Critical response

Critical response to Fantasia was largely positive, as reviewers praised her vocals and charisma as well as the album's production; she drew multiple comparisons to Aretha Franklin, Tina Turner and Patti LaBelle. Rolling Stone magazine said the album "expands her range, adds some attitude and comes up with some genuine R&B gems."  Allmusic found it "a bolder, better album than Free Yourself," adding that it "breaks Barrino free of her American Idol persona, giving her a sound and style that she can build a career upon." PopMatters.com said that "Fantasia is a solid second effort, made above average by that gem of a voice."  Many critics also commented that the album's decidedly R&B nature (which translates to a reduced audience) was inevitable due to the lack of crossover success from Barrino's debut.  Thomas Inskeep with Stylus magazine praised Fantasia's "rather astounding, multi-octave...voice, capable of the smoothest singing but also heavy on the grit,"  while at the same time lamenting that she will never be "America’s pop star...She’s too black." He then declared, "Fantasia wasn't meant to be America's pop star, anyway."  Sal Cinquemani with Slant Magazine said that "Fantasia's sophomore effort isn't exactly her Breakaway [Kelly Clarkson's hugely successful second album], but it's certainly a more unified artistic statement than 2004's Free Yourself."

On December 6, 2007, Fantasia garnered three 50th Annual Grammy Award nominations: Best Female R&B Vocal Performance for “When I See U”, Best Contemporary R&B Album for Fantasia, and Best R&B Song for "When I See U".

Commercial performance
Fantasia peaked at number nineteen on US Billboard 200 albums chart. It sold 133,000 copies in its first week and sold a total of 530,000 copies in the United States. It was certified Gold by Recording Industry Association of America (RIAA). It also peaked at number two on Top R&B/Hip-Hop Albums.

The first single from the album, "Hood Boy", peaked at number three on Bubbling Under Hot 100 Singles and number twenty-one on Hot R&B/Hip-Hop Songs. The second single, "When I See U", peaked at number twenty-one on the Billboard Hot 100 and number one on the Hot R&B/Hip-Hop Songs chart. The third single, "Only One U", peaked at number nineteen on the US Adult R&B Airplay chart and number thirty-six on the Hot R&B/Hip-Hop Songs chart.

Track listing

Notes
 signifies co-producer
Sample credits
"Hood Boy" interpolates "Happening" by American pop band The Supremes.
"Surround U" contains a sample from "Cross The Track (We Better Go Back)" by Maceo and the Macks, and "Christmas Rappin'" by Kurtis Blow.

Charts

Weekly charts

Year-end charts

Certifications

Unreleased tracks
 "Turn This Party Up" (featuring Missy Elliott)
 "Clap Ya Hands" (featuring Missy Elliott)
 "Broke"
 "Solo (So Low)"
 "Said I Wouldn't (No More)"
 "No Stoppin'" (produced by Missy Elliott, also recorded by Monica)

References

External links
 Fantasia's Official Website
 Fantasia's Official Myspace Page

2006 albums
Albums produced by Bryan-Michael Cox
Albums produced by Danja (record producer)
Albums produced by Dre & Vidal
Albums produced by Missy Elliott
Albums produced by Swizz Beatz
Albums produced by Tone Mason
Albums produced by Midi Mafia
Fantasia Barrino albums
J Records albums
19 Recordings albums
Funk albums by American artists